The 2013 season was the 116th season of competitive football in Sweden. The competitive year started with the group stage of Svenska Cupen on 2 March. League competition started in early April with Allsvenskan on 31 March, Superettan on 6 April, Division 1 and lower men's leagues plus the Damallsvenskan on 13 April. Svenska Cupen ended with the final played at the national stadium Friends Arena on 26 May. Allsvenskan ended on 3 November, Superettan one day earlier on 2 November, Division 1 and lower men's leagues on 26 October and Damallsvenskan on 20 October. Qualification play-offs were held after the end of league play with the Allsvenskan play-offs being held on 7 and 10 November and the Superettan play-offs being held on 6 and 9 November. Svenska Supercupen was held on 10 November and was contested by the winner of Allsvenskan and Svenska Cupen. Sweden participated in qualification for the 2014 FIFA World Cup. Sweden also hosted UEFA Women's Euro 2013 between 10 and 28 July.

Honours

Official titles

Competitions

Promotions, relegations and qualifications

Promotions

Relegations

International qualifications

Domestic results

2013 Allsvenskan

2013 Allsvenskan qualification play-offs

Halmstads BK won 3–2 on aggregate.

2013 Superettan

2013 Superettan qualification play-offs

IFK Värnamo won 5–2 on aggregate. 

Varbergs BoIS won 3–1 on aggregate.

2013 Division 1 Norra

2013 Division 1 Södra

2012–13 Svenska Cupen

Quarter-finals

Semi-finals

Final

2013 Svenska Supercupen

National team fixtures and results

Goalscorers

Own goals

Swedish clubs' performance in Europe
These are the results of the Swedish teams in European competitions during the 2013–14 season. (Swedish team score displayed first)

* For group games in Europa League, score in home game is displayed
** For group games in Europa League, score in away game is displayed

Notes

References 
Online

 
Seasons in Swedish football